is a passenger railway station in located in the city of  Daitō, Osaka Prefecture, Japan, operated by West Japan Railway Company (JR West).

Lines

Station layout
The station has two elevated island platforms with the station building underneath. The station has a Midori no Madoguchi staffed ticket office.

Platforms

Adjacent stations

History
The station was opened on 22 August 1895. 

Station numbering was introduced in March 2018 with Suminodō being assigned station number JR-H36.

Passenger statistics
In fiscal 2019, the station was used by an average of 30,999 passengers daily (boarding passengers only).

Surrounding area
 Daito City Hall
 Daito City Civic Hall
 Daito City Suminodo Junior High School
 Daito City Suminodokita Elementary School
 Daito City Suminodominami Elementary School

References

External links

Official home page 

Railway stations in Japan opened in 1895
Railway stations in Osaka Prefecture
Daitō, Osaka